The Victoria Mile is a Grade 1 flat horse race in Japan for four-year-old and above thoroughbred fillies and mares run over a distance of 1,600 metres (approximately 1 mile) on the turf at Tokyo Racecourse in May.

Winners

See also
 Horse racing in Japan
 List of Japanese flat horse races

References 
Racing Post: 

Mile category horse races for fillies and mares
Horse races in Japan
Turf races in Japan